One-Way Conversations is the debut album of Hollyn, released digitally on February 10, 2017 and physically on March 3, 2017. It follows the success of her first EP, Hollyn, released in 2015. The album peaked No. 6 on the US Billboard Christian Albums, surpassing the No. 10 peak her EP received.

Background 
When asked about the album title, Hollyn responded to Niagara Frontier Publications by saying, "These songs were just struggles in areas of my life, and even joyful times in my life that I've had over the past couple of years. And so, taking those experiences, and kind of hearing them again, through song, is kind of like a one-way conversation with myself. I just kind of feel like, sometimes too, am I talking to -- who am I talking to? Am I talking to a wall, almost, or are my prayers just hitting the ceiling kind of thing? You know what I mean? I'm having a one-way conversation with myself."

Critical reception 

Representing 365 Days of Inspiring Media with a four and a half star review, Jonathan Andre says, "The fact that the album has points of improvement means the Hollyn still has things to learn, which is good knowing that as a 19 year old, Hollyn's maturity and song writing skills is miles ahead of anyone who was 19 and in the music industry (even more than Rebecca St. James way back in the day, and that is saying a lot!)." Giving the album four stars for CCM Magazine, Andy Argyrakis writes, "But as Hollyn proves on this bright and memorable coming of age collection, which even includes collaborations with TobyMac, Andy Mineo, and fellow newcomer Steven Malcom, chances are she'll have no trouble navigating her way into ongoing artistic relevance and relatability." With four stars from The Christian Beat, Chris Major states, "With bold ambition, engaging tracks, and personal lyrics, One-Way Conversations has certainly set Hollyn up for an exciting future in CCM." From Jesus Freak Hideout, Lucas Munachen gives the album three stars saying, "If you're looking for a substitution for the many secular artists in this style, however, One-Way Conversations is well worth your time."

Track listing

Personnel 
Credits adapted from AllMusic.
 42 North – composer, producer
 Samuel Alexandre – composer
 Boerhaüs – design, layout
 Bob Boyd – assembly, mastering
 Chuck Butler – vocal engineer
 Daniel Chrisman – composer
 Joshua Crosby – mixing
 Diverse City – featured artist
 Big Drez – mixing
 Joey Elwood – executive producer
 Bryan Fowler – bass, composer, guitar, keyboards, mixing, producer, programming
 Israel Hindman – composer
 Hollyn – liner notes, primary artist
 Jack Tremaine jones – guitar
 Dave Lubben – composer, mixing, producer
 Steven Malcolm – composer, featured artist
 Toby McKeehan – A&R, composer, executive producer, featured artist
 Holly Miller – composer
 Andy Mineo – composer, featured artist
 Scottie Mineo – composer, producer
 Brad Moist – A&R
 Eric Ramey – composer
 Joel Rousseau –vocal editing
 Jake Rye – mixing
 Elvin Shahbazian – composer, mixing, producer
 Lee Steffen – photography
 Vonray – producer
 Cole Walowac – composer, producer

Chart performance

References 

2017 albums
Hollyn albums